Terellia tussilaginis, the gall fly,  is a species of tephritid  or fruit flies in the family Tephritidae.

Distribution
This species is present in most of Europe, in European Russia and in the East Palearctic ecozone.

Habitat
These flies inhabit meadows, gardens and where the host plants grow.

Description

These fruit flies have a pale green yellow body with distinctive brown banding on its wings. The costal cell is completely hyaline. Katepisternum shows reddish spots. The anterior half of mesonotum is reddish to brown. Tergite 4 is usually black.

Biology
Adults can be seen from June to August. The larvae live in the flowerheads of Arctium lappa, Arctium minus, Arctium tomentosum and Cirsium vulgare, feeding on them and causing galls to form.

References

Tephritinae
Diptera of Europe
Insects described in 1775
Taxa named by Johan Christian Fabricius